Steve Jackson (full name: Stephen Craig Jackson) is an American set theorist at the University of North Texas. Much of his most notable work has involved the descriptive set-theoretic consequences of the axiom of determinacy. In particular he is known for having calculated the values of all the projective ordinals (the suprema of the lengths of all prewellorderings of the real numbers at a particular level in the projective hierarchy) under the assumption that the axiom of determinacy holds.

In recent years he has also made contributions to the theory of Borel equivalence relations. With Dan Mauldin he solved the Steinhaus lattice problem.

Jackson earned his PhD in 1983 at UCLA under the direction of Donald A. Martin, with a dissertation on A Calculation of δ15. In it, he proved that, under the axiom of determinacy, thereby solving the first Victoria Delfino problem, one of the notorious problems of the combinatorics of the axiom of determinacy.

References

External links 
 List of papers published by Steve Jackson
 

University of California, Los Angeles alumni
University of North Texas faculty
20th-century American mathematicians
21st-century American mathematicians
Living people
Year of birth missing (living people)
Set theorists